Jeremiah Okorodudu-Okoro (born 24 May 1959) is a Nigerian boxer. He competed in the men's middleweight event at the 1984 Summer Olympics.

References

External links
 

1959 births
Living people
Nigerian male boxers
Olympic boxers of Nigeria
Boxers at the 1984 Summer Olympics
Place of birth missing (living people)
Commonwealth Games medallists in boxing
Commonwealth Games bronze medallists for Nigeria
Boxers at the 1982 Commonwealth Games
Middleweight boxers
Medallists at the 1982 Commonwealth Games